Lumsden (Colhoun) Airport  is located  north-east of Lumsden, Saskatchewan, Canada.

See also 
 List of airports in Saskatchewan
 Disley Aerodrome
 Lumsden (Metz) Airport

References

External links 
Page about this airport on COPA's Places to Fly airport directory

Registered aerodromes in Saskatchewan
Lumsden No. 189, Saskatchewan
Division No. 6, Saskatchewan